Zalaháshágy is a village in Zala County, in Hungary.

Geography
The Zala-hills form a rivercut hilly region in West Hungary. Zala river crosses over the region. The system of riverbeds and valleys were formed in the Cainozoic geological period.

Sightseeing
The main sightseeing of the village is the parochial church built in the 12th century. Some details of the church go back to the Árpád house kings and the period of coming the Hungarian arrival time in the 8-9th centuries, when the archaic animal style was frequently used in art. The old tympanon of the church can be found inside the church, built into the walls in a secondary position.

The scenario of the tympanon is a fight between two dragons. There very few such stone carvings in Western Eurasia. We know such tympanon in Sopron, St. Jacob chapel and also on the Attila sword, a sword from the Árpád dynasty age, and in exhibition in Vienna.

Notable residents 
 Antal Stevanecz, Slovene teacher and writer

References

Henszlmann Imre: Magyarország ó-keresztyén, román és átmeneti stylü mű-emlékeinek rövid ismertetése, Királyi Magyar Egyetemi Nyomda, Budapest, 1876.
Dercsényi D. (1972): Románkori építészet Magyarországon. Corvina, Budapest 
Bérczi Szaniszló, Bérczi Zsófia, Bérczi Katalin: Románkori templomkapuk: régi és új műveltség egymásrarétegződése a románkori templomok épületszobrászatában, kapukon és oszlopokon, TKTE, Piremon, 1997.
Aradi N. (főszerk.) (ész. n.): A művészet története Magyarországon, Gondolat Kiadó, Budapest

Official website
Zalaháshágy village official website (www.zalahashagy.hu)

Outer links

 Zalaháshágy on the homepage Vendégvárón

Romanesque architecture in Hungary
Populated places in Zala County